The Roommates Party (original title: Le Grand Partage) is a 2015 French comedy film directed by Alexandra Leclère.

Plot
Because winter is shaping up worse than ever, the government requisitions emergency accommodation, forcing many French citizens with housing to welcome into their homes the working poor, homeless, without access to housing despite being on a payroll. A wind of panic sets in everywhere in France and especially in the 86 rue du Cherche Midi, a stately building in one of the most exclusive areas of the capital.

Cast

 Karin Viard as Christine Dubreuil
 Didier Bourdon as Pierre Dubreuil
 Valérie Bonneton as Béatrice Bretzel
 Michel Vuillermoz as Grégory Bretzel
 Josiane Balasko as Bernadette
 Patrick Chesnais as The eccentric neighbor
 Firmine Richard as Philomena
 Sandra Zidani as Madeleine
 Michèle Moretti as Françoise Dubreuil
 Jackie Berroyer as Monsieur Abramovitch
 Anémone as Madame Abramovitch
 Lise Lamétrie as Madame Poil
 David Pujadas as himself
 Julian Bugier as himself
 Karine de Ménonville as herself

References

External links

2015 films
French comedy films
2010s French-language films
2015 comedy films
2010s French films